Benito Jaquez Jones (born November 27, 1997) is an American football defensive tackle for the Detroit Lions of the National Football League (NFL). He played college football at Ole Miss.

Professional career

Miami Dolphins
After playing four years at Ole Miss, Jones was signed by the Miami Dolphins as an undrafted free agent on April 25, 2020. He was waived during final roster cuts on September 5, and was signed to the practice squad two days later. He was elevated to the active roster on October 17, October 31, November 13, November 18, and November 24 for the team's weeks 6, 8, 10, 11, and 12 games against the New York Jets, Los Angeles Rams, Los Angeles Chargers, Denver Broncos, and Jets, and reverted to the practice squad following each game without having to clear waivers. He was signed to the active roster on December 2, 2020. He played 6 games during his rookie year of 2020, making one tackle.

On August 31, 2021, Jones was waived by the Dolphins and re-signed to the practice squad.

On April 19, 2022, Jones was re-signed by the Dolphins. He was waived on August 30, 2022.

Detroit Lions
Jones was claimed off waivers by the Detroit Lions on August 31, 2022.

References

External links
Ole Miss Rebels bio

1997 births
Living people
African-American players of American football
American football defensive tackles
Miami Dolphins players
Ole Miss Rebels football players
People from Waynesboro, Mississippi
Players of American football from Mississippi
21st-century African-American sportspeople
Detroit Lions players